The first season of Hawaii Five-O, an American television series, began September 20, 1968, and ended on March 19, 1969. It aired on CBS. The region 1 DVD was released on March 6, 2007.

Episodes

References

External links 
 
 

1968 American television seasons
1969 American television seasons
01